Serhiy Kernozhytskyi (born 23 June 1997 in Lukasheve, Zaporizhia Raion, Zaporizhia Oblast, Ukraine) is a professional Ukrainian football midfielder who plays for Metalurh Zaporizhya.

Kernozhytskyi is a product of FC Kosmos Zaporizhya youth sportive school. He made his debut for FC Zirka entering as a second-half substitute against FC Helios Kharkiv on 3 October 2015 in the Ukrainian First League.

References

External links
 
 

Ukrainian footballers
Association football midfielders
FC Zirka Kropyvnytskyi players
FC Zirka-2 Kirovohrad players
1997 births
Living people
Sportspeople from Zaporizhzhia Oblast